El Huique is a Chilean village located north of Palmilla, Colchagua Province.

References

Populated places in Colchagua Province